Pandi is a comedy actor from Tamil Nadu, India, who has acted in Tamil films and television shows. He played minor roles in a few films before joining television. He is known for his role as "Pandi" in the popular Tamil soap opera Kana Kaanum Kaalangal in  Star Vijay and later participated in Jodi Number One season 3. His breakthrough came with Angadi Theru in 2010.

Personal life
He married Padmini, an MBA graduate on 1st December 2013.

Filmography

Films

Television

Web series

References

Living people
Tamil male actors
Tamil comedians
Male actors in Tamil cinema
Tamil male television actors
Television personalities from Tamil Nadu
Male actors from Madurai
21st-century Tamil male actors
Tamil Reality dancing competition contestants
Indian male comedians
Year of birth missing (living people)